is a Prefectural Natural Park in Fukuoka Prefecture, Japan. Established in 1950, the park spans the municipalities of Kama, Asakura, Kurume, Ukiha, Yame, and Tachiarai. The park derives its name from the Chikugo River.

See also
 National Parks of Japan
 List of Places of Scenic Beauty of Japan (Fukuoka)

References

Parks and gardens in Fukuoka Prefecture
Protected areas established in 1950
1950 establishments in Japan